Karene may refer to:
Karene (Mysia), a town of ancient Mysia, now in Turkey
Karene District, in Sierra Leone